Temnostoma tuwense is a species of syrphid fly in the family Syrphidae.

Distribution
Russia.

References

Eristalinae
Insects described in 2004
Diptera of Europe